The Luxembourg Sales Lentz League is the name of the women's handball league of Luxembourg.

Competition Format 

The season begins with a tournament between the eights teams. The first six teams qualify for the play-offs, while the last two plays play-downs.

2016/17 Season participants

The following 8 clubs compete in the Sales Lentz League during the 2016–17 season.

National Division Champions

 1974 : HB Dudelange 
 1975 : HB Dudelange (2)
 1976 : HB Dudelange (3)
 1977 : HBC Bascharage
 1978 : HBC Bascharage (2)
 1979 : HBC Bascharage (3)
 1980 : HBC Bascharage (4)
 1981 : HBC Bascharage (5)
 1982 : HBC Bascharage (6)
 1983 : HBC Bascharage (7)
 1984 : HBC Bascharage (8)
 1985 : HBC Bascharage (9)
 1986 : HBC Bascharage (10)
 1987 : HC Espérance Rumelange
 1988 : HB Dudelange (4)
 1989 : HC Berchem
 1990 : HBC Bascharage (11)
 1991 : HBC Bascharage (12)
 1992 : HBC Bascharage (13)
 1993 : HBC Bascharage (14)
 1994 : HBC Bascharage (15)
 1995 : HBC Bascharage (16)
 1996 : HBC Bascharage (17)
 1997 : HBC Bascharage (18)
 1998 : HBC Bascharage (19)
 1999 : HBC Bascharage (20)
 2000 : HBC Bascharage (21)
 2001 : HBC Bascharage (22)
 2002 : HBC Bascharage (23)
 2003 : HBC Bascharage (24)
 2004 : HBC Bascharage (25)
 2005 : HBC Bascharage (26)
 2006 : HBC Bascharage (27)
 2007 : HBC Bascharage (28)
 2008 : HBC Bascharage (29)
 2009 : HBC Bascharage (30)
 2010 : HB Dudelange (5)
 2011 : HB Dudelange (6) 
 2012 : CHEV Diekirch
 2013 : HB Dudelange (7)
 2014 : HB Dudelange (8)
 2015 : HB Dudelange (9)
 2016 : HB Dudelange (10)

EHF coefficient ranking
For season 2017/2018, see footnote

27.  (25)  A1 Ethniki (4.58)
28.  (28)  Eerste Klasse (4.44)
29.  (31)  Sales Lentz League (3.00)
30.  (29)  Premier Handball League (2.44)
31.  (32)  Superliga (2.13)

External links
 www.flh.lu

References

Handball leagues in Luxembourg
Sales Lentz League Women
Luxembourg